Patrick Flanery (born 1975, Omaha, Nebraska) is an American author and academic.  He is currently a professor of Creative Writing at The University of Adelaide, and formerly taught at the Queen Mary University of London and the University of Reading.

Writing career
Partick Flanery wrote Absolution (2012), Fallen Land (2013) and I Am No One (2016). Philip Gourevitch, writing in The New Yorker, called Flanery "an exceptionally gifted and intelligent novelist". He has had two writing fellowships in Italy at the Bellagio Center (owned by the Rockefeller Foundation) in 2013 and the Santa Maddalena Foundation in 2014. In 2017 he was living in London.

Absolution
Flanery's debut novel, Absolution, weaves a story of South Africa's violent past and troubled present, built around a series of conversations between an aging novelist and her official biographer. It was originally published in 2012 by Atlantic Books in the UK and Riverhead in the USA and has since been translated into eleven languages. It was shortlisted for one of the Spear's Book Award in 2012 and was shortlisted for the International Dublin Literary Award, the Royal Society of Literature's Ondaatje Prize, the Flaherty-Dunnan First Novel Prize, and the Authors' Club (UK) Best First Novel Award. A review in The Financial Times declared that "Absolution serves as proof, if any were needed, that a novel can be both unashamedly literary and compellingly readable."

Other work
Taking up themes of the housing boom and bust, reparations for land stolen from black farmers, and creeping surveillance,  Fallen Land was very much in tune with the Zeitgeist when it came out in 2013. James Bradley of the Washington Post noted that "it paints a chilling picture of a society deranged by violence, paranoia and its own fantasies of self-reliance".

Flanery's third novel, I Am No One, was released in 2016. This book is about a university professor who returns to New York after teaching at Oxford.  Various disconcerting events convince him he is under surveillance and his privacy is being invaded by unknown people.

His non-fiction essays, reviews, and interviews have appeared in The Los Angeles Times, The Spectator, The Times Literary Supplement, Newsweek, The Guardian and The Daily Telegraph. He has also written several articles in academic journals.

References

Bibliography
 
 
 
 

American male writers
1974 births
Living people
21st-century American writers